Christian Baracat (born 5 June 1986) is a German international rugby union player, having played for the SC Neuenheim in the Rugby-Bundesliga and the German national rugby union team. He has played professional rugby since 1996.

Baracat made his debut for Germany on 29 September 2007 in friendly against Switzerland. He played five times for his country, his last game being against Spain on 15 November 2008. In the 2009–10 season, he was unable to play for Germany due to commitments in his studies. He was also unavailable for his club team as he was studying in Bruges, Belgium. As of 2012 he plays for Belgian club Kituro RC.

Baracat, who joined the SC Neuenheim from Paris Université Club, also played for SC 1880 Frankfurt before.

Honours

Club
 German rugby union cup
 Winners: 2007

National team
 European Nations Cup – Division 2
 Champions: 2008

Stats
Christian Baracat's personal statistics in club and international rugby:

Club

 As of 7 March 2010

National team

European Nations Cup

Friendlies & other competitions

 As of 7 March 2010

References

External links
 Christian Baracat at scrum.com
   Christian Baracat at totalrugby.de

1986 births
Living people
German rugby union players
Germany international rugby union players
SC 1880 Frankfurt players
SC Neuenheim players
Rugby union props
College of Europe alumni
German expatriate rugby union players
Expatriate rugby union players in France
Expatriate rugby union players in Belgium
German expatriate sportspeople in Belgium
German expatriate sportspeople in France